Mali Music is a 2002 album by musician Damon Albarn in collaboration with Malian musicians Afel Bocoum, Toumani Diabaté & Friends, and also featuring a cameo from Ko Kan Ko Sata.

Track listing 

 Spoons
 Bamako City
 Le Relax
 Nabintou Diakité (live recording)
 Makelekele
 The Djembe
 Tennessee Hotel
 Niger
 4AM at Toumani's
 Institut National Des Arts
 Kela Village
 Griot Village
 Le Hogon
 Sunset Coming On
 Ko Kan Ko Sata Doumbia on River
 Les Escrocs

References

2002 albums
Damon Albarn albums